Green Bay Glory is an American women's pre-professional soccer club based in Green Bay, Wisconsin, which plays in the USL W League. The team was formed in January 2019 and played its first WPSL season in 2019.

History
On January 11, 2019, Kerry Geocaris and Melissa Cruz-Cuene announced a new Women's Premier Soccer League team in Green Bay, called the Glory. Geocaris, a Green Bay native, had previously played for another WPSL team, the Milwaukee Torrent, and cited a lack of competitive women's soccer opportunities in the Green Bay area as a major factor in forming the Glory. The team was announced to play in the newly-formed Midwest Division as one of 29 expansion teams for the league. During the 2019 season they played at Aldo Santaga Stadium at University of Wisconsin-Green Bay. During the 2021 season the Green Bay Glory played at Capital Credit Union Park.

Starting with the 2022 season, the Green Bay Glory joined the USL W League.

Stadium

Current squad

References

External links
 

Association football clubs established in 2019
Soccer clubs in Wisconsin
2019 establishments in Wisconsin
Women's Premier Soccer League teams